Ridgway may refer to:

Places
Ridgway, Colorado
Ridgway State Park
Ridgway Dam
Mount Ridgway
Ridgway, Illinois
Ridgway, Pennsylvania
Ridgway Township (disambiguation)

Other uses
Ridgway (name)
Ridgway Potteries, British pottery company established 1794
Ridgway Dynamo & Engine Co, U.S. engineering company

See also
Ridgeway (disambiguation)